Shuki Nagar (born October 7, 1977) is a former Israeli footballer.

Career 
Nagar was considered one of the hottest prospects in Israeli football during his youth at Bnei Yehuda. Injuries and a lack of playing time hampered his ascension to becoming a prominent figure in Israeli football, and most of his career he bounced around between relegation bound clubs in the Israeli Premier League and clubs who were trying to get promotion from Liga Leumit.

On June 25, 2012 Nagar signed with Maccabi Yavne, he played there for 3 years. In the middle of the 2014-15 season, Nagar started to work as the CEO of the club. He was fired from his job in the end of the 2015-16 season as Yavne got relegated to Liga Alef.

Honours
Israel State Cup (1):
2005
Liga Leumit (1):
2007–08

References

External links
Profile at ONE
Stats at IFA

1977 births
Living people
Israeli Jews
Israeli footballers
Maccabi Haifa F.C. players
Maccabi Tel Aviv F.C. players
Hapoel Be'er Sheva F.C. players
F.C. Ashdod players
Bnei Sakhnin F.C. players
Hapoel Petah Tikva F.C. players
Hakoah Maccabi Amidar Ramat Gan F.C. players
Maccabi Herzliya F.C. players
Hapoel Ashkelon F.C. players
Maccabi Ahi Nazareth F.C. players
Maccabi Yavne F.C. players
Liga Leumit players
Israeli Premier League players
Israeli people of Yemeni-Jewish descent
Association football defenders